The Little House in Kolomna, is a 1913 Russian short film directed by Pyotr Chardynin.

Plot 

The film is based on the 1830 poem The Little House in Kolomna by Alexander Pushkin.

Starring 
 Praskovya Maksimova
 Sofya Goslavskaya
 Ivan Mozzhukhin

References

External links 
 

1913 films
1910s Russian-language films
1913 short films
Films based on works by Aleksandr Pushkin
Russian silent short films
Russian black-and-white films
Films of the Russian Empire